They've Invaded Pleasantville is a 1981 board game published by TSR.

Gameplay
They've Invaded Pleasantville is a game for two players who are townsfolk trying to alert their fellow townsmen of the invasion and avert the aliens' plans.

Reception
William A. Barton reviewed They've Invaded Pleasantville in The Space Gamer No. 42. Barton commented that "Unless you shudder every time you remember those old late-show sci-fi flicks or you tend to shun anything less complex than Freedom in the Galaxy, you should find They've Invaded Pleasantville an amusing little diversion."

References

Board games introduced in 1981
TSR, Inc. games